Émile Vacher (May 7, 1883 - April 8, 1969) was a French accordionist associated with, and often deemed the creator of, the bal-musette genre.

Discography 78s 
 Sous les toits de paris / Rêve d’amour, Odéon 238.101
 Nous deux / Un baiser, Odéon 238.163
 Albert / Meunier tu dors, Odéon 165.796
 J’ai ma combine / C’est Rosalie, Odéon 238.291
 On me suit / La java de Doudoune, Odéon 165.311
 Julie...c'est Julie / Tout ca c'est pour Vous, Odéon 165.312

References

External links 

 Music on Spotify

Musicians from Tours, France
1883 births
1969 deaths
French accordionists
20th-century accordionists
Deaths from cancer in France